Wilkerson is a surname. Notable people with the surname include:

 Aaron Wilkerson (born 1989), American baseball player
 Brad Wilkerson (born 1977), American baseball player
 Brandie Wilkerson (born 1992), Canadian beach volleyball player
 Cathlyn Platt Wilkerson (born 1945), American radical and member of the Weather Underground
 David Wilkerson (1931–2011), American evangelist
 David Wilkerson (politician) (born 1969), American politician
 Doug Wilkerson (1947–2021), American football player
 Eric Wilkerson (born 1966), American football player
 Gerald Eugene Wilkerson (born 1939), Auxiliary Bishop of the Roman Catholic Archdiocese of Los Angeles 
 Herbert L. Wilkerson (1919-2021), U.S. Marine Corps Major general
 Isabel Wilkerson (born 1961), American journalist and Pulitzer Prize winner
 Isaiah Wilkerson (born 1990), American basketball player
 James Herbert Wilkerson (1869–1948), US federal judge 
 Jerry Wilkerson (1943–2007), American painter
 Joshua Wilkerson (1992–2010), American student murdered by an illegal immigrant in Texas
 Kimberly Wilkerson, former Miss Wyoming
 Kristian Wilkerson (born 1997), American football player
 Lawrence Wilkerson (born 1945), U.S. Army officer, deputy to Colin Powell
 Lizzie Wilkerson (1895–1984), African-American folk artist
 Mark Wilkerson (born 1976), lead singer and guitarist of the rock band Course of Nature
 Muhammad Wilkerson (born 1989), US football Defensive End for the New York Jets of the National Football League
 Nathaniel P. Wilkerson (born 1972), Gitksan artist from British Columbia, Canada
 Oscar Lawton Wilkerson (1926-2023), American pilot
 Ponchai Wilkerson (1971–2000), American murderer who was executed in Texas
 Robert King Wilkerson (born 1942), Black Panther Party member
 Stevie Wilkerson (born 1992), American baseball player
 Tichi Wilkerson Kassel (1926–2004), American film personality and the publisher of "The Hollywood Reporter"
 Tim Wilkerson (born 1960), NHRA drag racer
 Tyler Wilkerson (born 1988), American basketball player
 Wallace Wilkerson (c. 1834–1879), American murderer whose execution by firing squad in Utah was botched
 William R. Wilkerson (1890–1962), founder of "The Hollywood Reporter", Ciro's, and the Flamingo Hotel

Fictional characters:
 "Wilkerson", the family name in the television show Malcolm in the Middle